Justice Underwood may refer to:

J. W. Underwood, associate justice of the Nebraska Supreme Court
Robert C. Underwood, associate justice of the Supreme Court of Illinois
Wynn Underwood, associate justice of the Vermont Supreme Court

See also
Judge Underwood (disambiguation)